Applied Instruments, Inc. is a manufacturer of RF test and measurement equipment for the telecommunications industry. The company is headquartered in Indianapolis, Indiana. It was founded in 1986.

Applied Instruments, Inc. began operations in 1986 to meet the requirements of cable television operators who needed specific equipment to ensure the integrity of their new or existing systems.

Products include:
 Satellite Signal Level Meters
 Broadband Noise Generators
 Multi-Carrier RF Signal Generators
 RF Signal Monitors and Switch Controllers
 Return Band Alignment System
 Noise Power Ratio Test Sets
 Calibrators

References

External links
 Applied Instruments official website

Industry Associations
 SCTE - Society of Cable Telecommunications Engineers
 SBCA - Satellite Broadcasting and Communications Association
 NTCA - National Telecommunications Cooperative Association

Electronics companies of the United States
Manufacturing companies based in Indianapolis
Manufacturing companies established in 1986
Electronic test equipment manufacturers
Telecommunications companies of the United States
American companies established in 1986